The 1993 World Cup of Golf took place November 11–14 at the Lake Nona Golf & Country Club in Orlando, Florida, United States. It was the 39th World Cup. The tournament was a 72-hole stroke play team event with each team consisting of two players from a country. The combined score of each team determined the team results. Individuals also competed for the International Trophy. The winners share of the prize money was $300,000 going to the winning pair and $100,000 to the top individual. The United States team of Fred Couples and Davis Love III won (for the second time in a row with the same players in the team) by five strokes over the Zimbabwe team of Mark McNulty and Nick Price. Bernhard Langer of Germany took the International Trophy by three strokes over Couples.

Teams

Scores 
Team

Roy Mackenzie of Chile withdrew with a neck injury and Park Nam-sin of South Korea was disqualified for signing an incorrect scorecard.

International Trophy

Sources:

References

World Cup (men's golf)
Golf in Florida
Sports competitions in Orlando, Florida
World Cup
World Cup golf
International sports competitions in Florida